James W. Slaughter (May 13, 1928 – August 2, 1999) was an American professional basketball player. Slaughter was selected in the 1951 NBA Draft by the Tri-Cities Blackhawks after a collegiate career at South Carolina. He played for the Baltimore Bullets in 1951–52 and averaged 5.3 points, 5.3 rebounds and 0.9 assists per contest in 28 career games.

References

External links
Jim Slaughter @ TheDraftReview
After 50 years, Jim Slaughter still stands tall. (Adamson, Scott). February 8, 2008. Retrieved on February 7, 2013.

1928 births
1999 deaths
American men's basketball players
Baltimore Bullets (1944–1954) players
Basketball players from Virginia
Centers (basketball)
South Carolina Gamecocks men's basketball players
Sportspeople from Roanoke, Virginia
Tri-Cities Blackhawks draft picks
Washington Capitols players